Heartaches is a 1916 American silent short film directed by Lloyd B. Carleton. The film is based on a story by Grant Carpenter. This drama's features Dorothy Davenport, Alfred Allen, and Emory Johnson.

This story is about an old Southern plantation owner reminiscing how a minor quarrel destroyed the relationship with the love of his life. When his grandson has a minor argument with his girlfriend and seeks advice from his grandfather, the grandfather related his story of lost love and told his grandson to patch things up quickly.

The film was released on May 19, 1916, by Universal.

Plot

Stonewall Jackson (Jack) Hunt attends Harvard University where, besides his studies, he also runs track. One day, he receives a letter from his grandfather, Judge Randolph. The judge's letter informs Jack he can no longer send money to support his education. The judge explains his Virginia plantation is now fully mortgaged. He only remains on the plantation through the good graces of the mortgage holder - The New York Trust Company. While traveling to a competition, Jack catches his first glimpse of the younger Virginia Payne. It intrigues him.

Virginia Payne lives in Cambridge, Massachusetts, with her grandmother, who uses a wheelchair, Virginia Warrington Payne. Virginia has decided to attend a local college meet. Before she leaves home, she gives her grandmother and her old silk purse, which she always keeps close by, and puts an old gown of her youth on a nearby chair. Virginia's friends pick her up, and they head to the games. During the meet, she sees Jack for the first time. After a while, she starts cheering for him.

While her granddaughter is away, her grandmother dreams about her old sweetheart and how they parted, never to see each other again. Then she sighed and went to sleep. She would never awake. At the same time, Judge Randolph is sitting in front of his fireplace. He is dreaming about the love of his life and how he lets her slip away.

When Virginia returns home, she finds her grandmother has passed away. Her grandmother is holding a packet. An attached note says Virginia should not open this package until she is engaged. Virginia also finds a letter addressed to Judge William Randolph. She mails the letter. When the judge receives the letter, he finds out Virginia is now alone in the world. Virginia's grandmother then asked Judge Randolph if he could protect Virginia for old time's sake. The judge wires Virginia to travel to his plantation.

Jack is desperate for money, so he enters a poker game. He loses everything. Jack finds out where Virginia lives and decides on a visit. Jack becomes concerned when he sees crepe draped all over the house and is relieved to find out it is for Virginia's grandmother. With no money and no prospects, he decided to return to his grandfather's plantation in Virginia. On the same day, Jack decides to return to his grandfather's plantation; unbeknownst to Jack, Virginia is traveling to the same destination. Jack tries to ride for free with the baggage but is caught and thrown off the train. Amid the chaos, Virginia recognized Jack, learns of his circumstances, and offers to pay his fare. Jack refuses at first, then finds out they are both headed to his grandfather's plantation. He then accepts Virginia's offer.

It surprises the judge when they both show up at his front door. The judge is amazed at the resemblance of Virginia to her grandmother. The judge soon learns Jack has gambled away everything. The judge tells Jack if he wants to live like a gentleman, he will need to work on the plantation alongside the other laborers. Jack has no choice but to accept.

Soon after that, the judge discovers Jack and Virginia kissing in the back of a shed. The judge warns Jack not to trifle with her affections. Jack assures the judge that will never happen. Soon the young lovers have a squabble over some petty matter. A concerned judge chooses to impart some of his wisdom.

The judge tells Virginia: 
 Nothing is the beginning - Nothing is the end - but many heartaches lie between.
The judge then relates how a minor quarrel led to a breakup with the women he loved more than life itself. They never got back together. He never stopped loving her and will until the day he dies. He then tells Virginia the woman he loved was her grandmother. Virginia is overcome with emotion and begs the judge to talk to Jack.

The judge speaks to Jack and tells him to apologize to Virginia. After some persuasive back-and-forth, Jack leaves to find Virginia. When he finds her, she is dressed in her grandmother's old gown, the same dress her grandmother wore when she broke up with the judge. Jack says he is genuinely sorry for the quarrel. They engage in a warm embrace.

Virginia feels now is the time to open the sealed packet her grandmother left her. The pack contains the mortgage from Judge Randolph to the New York Trust Company. The mortgage is paid in full, and the property is assigned to her grandmother. Virginia recognizes her grandmother had lived a frugal life to save the judge's plantation. While still wearing her grandmother's gown, she takes the mortgage to Judge Randolph. The judge imagines he sees Virginia Warrington and realizes that Virginia's grandmother never stopped loving him.

Cast

Production

Development
According to the book - The Universal Story, Carl Laemmle (1867-1939) produced around 91 movies in 1916.
Lloyd B. Carleton (–1933) started working for Carl Laemmle in the Fall of 1915. Carleton arrived with impeccable credentials, having directed some 60 films for the likes of Thanhouser, Lubin, Fox, and Selig. 
Between March and December 1916, 44-year-old Lloyd Carleton directed 16 movies for Universal, starting with The Yaqui and ending with The Morals of Hilda. Emory Johnson acted in all 16 of these films. Of Carleton's total 1916 output, 11 were feature films, and the rest were two-reel shorts.

In 1916, Carleton directed all 13 films pairing Dorothy Davenport and Emory Johnson. This film would be the third in the 13-film series. These totals show Carl Laemmle was clearly giving the Davenport-Johnson pairing one of his elite directors from the working cadre of universal directors to produce the screen chemistry Laemmle was seeking.

Casting
Dorothy Davenport (1895-1977) was an established star for Universal when the  year-old actress played Virginia Payne. She had acted in hundreds of movies by the time she starred in this film. The majority of these films were 2-reel shorts, as was the norm in Hollywood's teen years. She had been making movies since 1910. She started dating Wally Reid when she was barely 16, and he was 20. They married in 1913. After her husband died in 1923, she used the name "Mrs. Wallace Reid" in the credits for any project she took part in. Besides being an actress, she would eventually become a film director, producer, and writer.
Emory Johnson (1894-1960) was  years old when he acted in this movie as Stonewall Jackson (Jack) Hunt. In January 1916, Emory signed a contract with Universal Film Manufacturing Company. Carl Laemmle of Universal Film Manufacturing Company thought he saw great potential in Johnson, so he chooses him to be Universal's new leading man. Laemmle's hope was Johnson would become another Wallace Reed. A major part of his plan was to create a movie couple that would sizzle on the silver screen. Laemmle thought Dorothy Davenport and Emory Johnson could create the chemistry he sought. Johnson and Davenport would complete 13 films together. They started with the successful feature production of Doctor Neighbor in May 1916 and ended with The Devil's Bondwoman in November 1916. After completing the last movie, Laemmle thought Johnson did not have the screen presence he wanted. He decided not to renew his contract. Johnson would make 17 movies in 1916, including 6 shorts and 11 feature-length Dramas. 1916 would become the second-highest movie output of his entire acting career. Emory acted in  25 films for Universal, mostly dramas with a sprinkling of comedies and westerns.
Alfred Allen (1866-1947) was  years old when he was selected to play Judge William Randolph.    He was a logical choice to play a judge since he was highly educated, had a commanding presence and stood six feet, and weighed two hundred pounds. He got his start in the film industry at Universal city in 1913.  He landed his first role in 1915. His roles were character parts, and he played mostly fathers, villains, or ranch owners. Alfred Allen appeared in 69 features from 1916 through 1929. After Heartaches he would appear in four more Davenport-Johnson projects: A Yoke of Gold, The Unattainable, The Human Gamble and Barriers of Society.
Helen Wright (1868-1928) was  years old when she acted in this movie playing Virginia Warrington Payne. Helen Wright (born Helen Boyd) was a well-known Universal character actress who appeared mostly in silent films between 1915 and 1930. She spent most of her career under contract at Universal. She would later appear with Emory Johnson in the Universal production of The Morals of Hilda.

Screenplay
The movie is based on a story written by  year old Louis Grant Carpenter (1865–1936). Carpenter had worked as a newspaperman and an attorney. In 1916, he moved to Manhattan, New York City, to embark upon a new career as a writer.

Filming
The movie was filmed in the studio complex at Universal Studios located at 100 Universal City Plaza in Universal City, California.

Alternate title
The Laemmle 2-reel short film of Heartaches should not be confused with the 1915 feature film Heartaches. The 1915 4-reel production was directed by Joseph Kaufman and produced by Lubin. The film starred Vinnie Burns and Jessie Terry. The film was released on December 20, 1915. Releasing movies with identical names is uncommon, but the six-month difference in these two films' release dates is unique. There are no copyright listings for Lubin's 1915 Heartaches in either the individual movie listings or the section sorted by producing companies in the Catalog of Copyright Entries. Movie title names can not be copyrighted.

Advertising
In 1916, advertising money spent on short films was minimal compared to feature films. A brief synopsis was the norm. Short films were shown in conjunction with other short films to create a "diversified program." In this case, a newspaper ad showed Heartaches playing along with two other films. The other films are:
The 19th installment of the serial Graft, with the two-reel production of  - .

Reviews

In the May 20, 1916 issue of the Moving Picture World, the reviewer writes:

In the May 24, 1916 issue of the Fort Worth Star-Telegram, the reviewer writes:

Preservation status
Since no records detail this film's status, it is presumed all copies of this film are lost.

Gallery

References

External links
Katchmer, George A. A Biographical Dictionary of Silent Film Western Actors and Actresses, McFarland, 2002, p. 204.
List of Universal Pictures films (1912–1919)
Universal Pictures
List of American films of 1916

1916 lost films
1916 drama films
1916 films
American black-and-white films
American silent short films
1910s English-language films
Lost American films
Silent American drama films
Universal Pictures short films
Films directed by Lloyd B. Carleton
1910s American films